The Karnataka Women's League, also referred to as the Karnataka Women’s Super Division League, is the top division of women's football league in the Indian State of Karnataka. The League is organised by the Karnataka State Football Association (KSFA), the official football governing body of the State.

Clubs

2019–20 season
The following seven clubs competed in the second season of the Karnataka Women's League.
 Bangalore Soccer Galaxy
 Bangalore United
 Belgaum United
 Kickstart FC
 Mangalore United
 Misaka United
 Parikrma Girls

2021 season

The previous KSFA Women's Super Division League had participation from seven teams and the number has risen to 10 this time around. Compared to the previous season, the new entrants are Indian Football Factory, Maatru Pratishtana, Rebels Women's FC and Bengaluru Braves FC. These Four teams were selected from the KSFA 'A' Division Women's League which had nine teams in three different pools. While Bengaluru Braves FC emerged Champions finishing atop the standings after the final round, all four teams Indian Football Factory, Maatru Pratishtana, Rebels Women's FC and Bengaluru Braves FC were promoted to the KSFA Women's Super Division League. The decision to promote four teams came because to qualify for the Indian Women's League, Clubs have to play a minimum of eight matches.

History
The Karnataka Women's League was formed in 2018 to give effect to the mandate sent out by the All India Football Federation, India's governing body of professional football, to each State to form leagues. It said that the winner of the league would be promoted to compete in the Indian Women's League. Subsequently, M. Satyanarayan, a journalist and then member of the Governing Board and Core Committee of the Karnataka State Football Association (KSFA) organized the Impetus Tournament in the Bangalore Football Stadium to "gauge the state of women's football in Karnataka". Against an estimated four teams, eighteen turned up and this led to the formation of the League, in January 2019. Five teams competed its first season.

Champions 
{|
|-
|valign="top" |

See also 
 Football in India

References 

Women's football leagues in India
Football in Karnataka
Sports leagues established in 2019